John Morgan McSweeney was the first American Ambassador to Bulgaria (1967–1969).  At first, he was 
Envoy Extraordinary and Minister Plenipotentiary until being promoted to Ambassador in 1967.

From 1959 until 1962, McSweeney was the director of the Office of Soviet Union Affairs at the State Department and also served as political advisor to the Allied Forces for Southern Europe in Naples, Italy, and to the Strategic Air Command in Omaha, Nebraska.

Born in Boston in 1916, McSweeney graduated from Brown University.  He died of cancer at his home in Sarasota, Florida on December 12, 1979.

References

Ambassadors of the United States to Bulgaria
people from Boston
People from Sarasota, Florida
Brown University alumni
Personnel of Strategic Air Command